Stoliczka's trident bat (Aselliscus stoliczkanus) is a species of bat in the family Hipposideridae. It is found in China, Laos, Malaysia, Myanmar, Thailand, and Vietnam. In northern Thailand, it is found in Doi Pha Hom Pok National Park.

References

Simmons, N.B. 2005. Order Chiroptera. Pp. 312–529 in Wilson, D.E. and Reeder, D.M. (eds.). Mammal Species of the World: a taxonomic and geographic reference. 3rd ed. Baltimore: The Johns Hopkins University Press, 2 vols., 2142 pp. 

Aselliscus
Mammals described in 1871
Taxonomy articles created by Polbot
Taxa named by George Edward Dobson
Bats of Asia